George Arthur Boeckling (February 2, 1862 – July 24, 1931) was an American businessman who served as the president of “Cedar Point Pleasure Resort Company of Indiana”, which later became Cedar Fair Entertainment Company.  He is often credited for bringing Cedar Point out of financial difficulties at the turn of the 20th century, and making it a nationally recognized amusement park and resort destination.

G.A. Boeckling was born to German immigrants in Indiana in 1862. In 1897, he became part-owner and general-manager of the newly re-organized Cedar Point Pleasure Resort Company (originally established a decade prior, in 1887, and first opened in 1888, according to numerous contemporaneous sources, 1887-1897). Under Boeckling’s leadership, Cedar Point resort was transformed from a summer picnic/swimming area to a thriving amusement park with wide appeal.

In 1908, the steamer G.A. Boeckling began providing local transportation between the city of Sandusky and Cedar Point. Thousands of visitors also arrived at Cedar Point on the Pennsylvania Railroad and Lake Shore Electric Railway.

An administration building was constructed by the pier in 1928. Known as the Boeckling Building, it features arches, a cupola, and other ornamental features.

G.A. Boeckling was very public-spirited, a member of the Chamber of Commerce, Elks Lodge, Aerie of Eagles, and was charitable to local churches, veterans organizations, and youth clubs of Sandusky. In 1922 the Sandusky Register called him "the man who made Cedar Point."

George A. Boeckling died from uremia on July 24, 1931, and is buried at Oakland Cemetery.

The G.A. Boeckling steamship, Boeckling Home, and Boeckling Building are all listed on the National Register of Historic Places. The Cedar Point & Lake Erie Railroad had a locomotive named the G.A. Boeckling built in July 1927 b. Davenport Locomotive Works.

See also
National Register of Historic Places listings in Sandusky, Ohio

References

External links
Cedar Point History
gravesite of G.A.Boeckling

1862 births
1931 deaths
Cedar Point
American amusement park businesspeople